Archery at the 2008 Summer Paralympics consists of nine events, five for men and four for women. The competitions were held at the Olympic Green Archery Field from September 9 to September 15, 2008.

Classification
Archers are given a classification depending on the type and extent of their disability. The classification system allows archers to compete against others with a similar level of function.

Archery classes are:
 Wheelchair 1 (W1)
 Wheelchair 2 (W2)
 Standing (ST)

Events
For each of the events below, medals are contested for one or more of the above classifications.

 Men's individual compound
 Open
 W1
 Men's individual recurve
 Standing
 W1/W2
 Men's team recurve
 Open
 Women's individual compound
 Open
 Women's individual recurve
 Standing
 W1/W2
 Women's team recurve
 Open

Participating countries
There were 134 athletes (86 males, 48 females) from 28 countries competing in this sport.

Medal summary

Medal table

This ranking sorts countries by the number of gold medals earned by their archers (in this context a country is an entity represented by a National Paralympic Committee). The number of silver medals is taken into consideration next and then the number of bronze medals. If, after the above, countries are still tied, equal ranking is given and they are listed alphabetically.

Men's events

Women's events

See also
Archery at the 2008 Summer Olympics

References

External links
Official site of the 2008 Summer Paralympics
IPC
FITA

 
2008
2008 Summer Paralympics events